Hiyya Rofe ( 1620) was rabbi of Safed. Having studied Talmud under Solomon Sagis and Cabala under Hayyim Vital, Hiyya was ordained in accordance with the old system ("semikah") reintroduced into Palestine by Jacob Berab. In 1612 Hiyya gave his approbation to Issachar Baer Eylenburg's "Be'er Sheba'." Most of Hiyya's works have been lost; the remainder were published by his son, Meïr Rofe, under the title "Ma'aseh Ḥiyya" (Venice, 1652), containing novellæ on several of the Talmudic treatises, and twenty-seven responsa. These were revised by Moses Zacuto, who added a preface.

References 

 Encyclopaedia Judaica (2007): "Ḥiyya Rofe"

16th-century births
1620 deaths
17th-century rabbis from the Ottoman Empire
Rabbis in Safed
Rabbis in Ottoman Galilee